Heart and Soul is a young adult novel by novelist and poet Liz Rosenberg.

1996 American novels
American young adult novels
1996 debut novels